The Lost World is a 1998 adventure film, loosely based on the 1912 novel of the same name by Arthur Conan Doyle. The film includes the characters, Professor George Challenger and Lord John Roxton, who also feature in Conan Doyle's other Doctor Challenger novels.

Plot 
In 1934, the researcher Maple White and his assistant Azbek discover a world populated by dinosaurs situated on a Mongolian plateau, soon after, the pair are attacked by Eudimorphodons; Azbek is killed and White survives.

White seeks out his friend, George Challenger, giving an account of his adventures, proposing a further expedition to fully explore the Mongolian plateau.

In London, Challenger organised a lecture in an attempt to convince his colleagues, Professor Summerlee and Lord Thomas, to finance the further expedition with the goal of proving dinosaurs exist on the plateau. Lord Thomas grants permission for the expedition on the condition Summerlee accompanies Challenger. Oscar Perreault, a spectator at the lecture, proposes to pay for the expedition's expenses if the scientists capture a living dinosaur, and sends his associate, John Roxton, to represent his interests. Challenger accepts the proposal.

Challenger also invites to the expedition, journalist Arthur Malone, and Maple White's daughter, Amanda.

In Mongolia, the team meets their guides, Myar and Djena. En route, their transportation suffers a breakdown, and the journey continues on foot. One of the guides is killed by a presumably prehistoric insect; however, despite misgivings, the team continues.

On reaching the foot of the plateau, Amanda is abducted by Neanderthals, prompting a search. Challenger and Roxton find Amanda suspended from a ritual framework. During the rescue, they face the Neanderthals, who they quickly defeat. The team attempts to escape the plateau in a hot air balloon. Summerlee observes nearby Quetzalcoatlus, and they attack the balloon, causing Myar to fall and an irreparable tear to the balloon, the whole team drop back to the plateau.

The team then encounters numerous challenges, including an attack from an unknown creature and an attempt by Roxton to maroon the team on the plateau.

They discover symbols on a cave wall, portraying a tribe, the Kerraks. The Kerraks interacted with prehistoric creatures and fought the Neanderthals. The Neanderthals eventually defeating the Kerraks to avoid the destruction of the 'Lost World'.

A second, larger cave is then discovered by the team, which the same one discovered by Maple White. John Roxton, in possession of a Eudimorphodon, intends to explode a dynamite charge within the cave to kill the team and escape alone, however, he is foiled by Challenger.

The team attempt to fashion a parachute using the remains of the balloon, and after suffering a further attack by the creates which inhabit the plateau, they manage to escape.

Returning to London, Challenger communicates the death of his companions to the students and, in an attempt to discourage further expeditions, he chooses to state his expedition found nothing.

In the last scenes of the film, it is revealed Malone has survived and adapted to life on the plateau.

Cast
 Patrick Bergin as Professor George Challenger
 Jayne Heitmeyer as Amanda White
 Julian Casey as Arthur Malone
 David Nerman as John Roxton
 Michael Sinelnikoff as Professor Summerlee
 Gregoriane Minot Payeur as Djena
 Jack Langedijk as Maple White
 Russell Yuen as Azbek/Myar/Neanderthal
 James Bradford as Lord Thomas
 Jacques Lessard as Oscar Perreault
 Martin Sims as Student
 Gouchy Boy, Michael Gurman, Michel Perron, Sam Stone, Richard Zeman as Neanderthals

Home video
The film was released direct to VHS in several countries, and on DVD in the UK and Australia.

References

External links
 
 
 
 

American independent films
1998 direct-to-video films
1998 films
1990s fantasy adventure films
American fantasy adventure films
Films about dinosaurs
Films set in Mongolia
Films set in the 1930s
Professor Challenger films
Fiction about neanderthals
Films produced by John Landis
1990s English-language films
1990s American films